Surattha strioliger is a moth in the family Crambidae. It is found in Iran, Saudi Arabia and the United Arab Emirates.

References

Ancylolomiini
Moths described in 1913
Moths of Asia